James Bonner is the name of:

Jimmy Bonner (1906–1963), African-American baseball player who played in Japan
James Bonner (Patriot) (1719–1782), active in the American Revolutionary War
James E. Bonner (general), United States Army general
James F. Bonner (1910–1996), American molecular biologist
James Bonner (reality television) (died 2018), featured on My 600-lb Life